Fraternities and sororities are social organizations at North American colleges and universities.

Generally, membership in a fraternity or sorority is obtained as an undergraduate student, but continues thereafter for life. Some accept graduate students as well.

Individual fraternities and sororities vary in organization and purpose, but most share five common elements:

 Secrecy
 Single-sex membership
 Selection of new members on the basis of a two-part vetting and probationary process known as rushing and pledging
 Ownership and occupancy of a residential property where undergraduate members live
 A set of complex identification symbols that may include Greek letters, armorial achievements, ciphers, badges, grips, hand signs, passwords, flowers, and colors

Fraternities and sororities engage in philanthropic activities, host parties, provide "finishing" training for new members such as instruction on etiquette, dress and manners, and create networking opportunities for their newly graduated members.

Fraternities and sororities can be tax-exempt 501(c)(7) organizations in the United States.

Fraternities and sororities have been widely criticized for practicing elitism and favoritism, discriminating against non-white students and other marginalized groups, conducting dangerous hazing rituals, and facilitating alcohol abuse. Fraternities specifically have been further criticized for encouraging misogynistic behavior and perpetrating sexual violence. Many colleges and universities have sought to reform or eliminate them due to these concerns, but these efforts have typically been met with intense controversy.

History

Establishment and early history

The first fraternity in North America to incorporate most of the elements of modern fraternities was Phi Beta Kappa, founded at the College of William and Mary in 1775. The founding of Phi Beta Kappa followed the earlier establishment of two other secret student societies that had existed at that campus as early as 1750. In 1779 Phi Beta Kappa expanded to include chapters at Harvard and Yale. By the early 19th century, the organization transformed itself into a scholastic honor society and abandoned secrecy.

In 1825, Kappa Alpha Society, the first fraternity to retain its social characteristic, was established at Union College in Schenectady, New York. In 1827, Sigma Phi and Delta Phi were also founded at the same institution, creating the Union Triad. The further birthing of Psi Upsilon (1833), Chi Psi (1841), and Theta Delta Chi (1847) collectively established Union College as the Mother of Fraternities.

The social fraternity Chi Phi, officially formed in 1854, traces its roots to a short-lived organization founded at Princeton University in Princeton, New Jersey, in 1824 bearing the same name.

Fraternities represented the intersection between dining clubs, literary societies and secret initiatory orders such as Freemasonry. Their early growth was widely opposed by university administrators, though the increasing influence of fraternity alumni, as well as several high-profile court cases, succeeded in largely muting opposition by the 1880s. The first fraternity meeting hall, or lodge, seems to have been that of the Alpha Epsilon chapter of Chi Psi at the University of Michigan in Ann Arbor, Michigan, in 1845, leading to a tradition in that fraternity to name its buildings "lodges". As fraternity membership was punishable by expulsion at many colleges at this time, the house was located deep in the woods. The first residential chapter home, built by a fraternity, is believed to have been Alpha Delta Phi's chapter at Cornell University, with groundbreaking dated to 1878. Alpha Tau Omega became the first fraternity to own a residential house in the South when, in 1880, its chapter at the University of the South acquired one. Chapters of many fraternities followed suit, purchasing and, less often, building them with support of alumni. Phi Sigma Kappa's chapter home at Cornell, completed in 1902, is the oldest such house still occupied by its fraternal builders.

Sororities

Sororities, originally called women's fraternities, began to develop in 1851 with the formation of the Adelphean Society Alpha Delta Pi, though fraternity-like organizations for women didn't take their current form until the establishment of Pi Beta Phi in 1867 and Kappa Alpha Theta and Kappa Kappa Gamma in 1870. The term sorority was used by a professor of Latin at Syracuse University, Dr. Frank Smalley, who felt the word "fraternity" was inappropriate for a group of ladies. The word comes from Latin soror, meaning "sister," "cousin, daughter of a father's brother," or "female friend." The first organization to use the term "sorority" was Gamma Phi Beta, established in 1874.

The development of fraternities for women during this time was a major accomplishment in the way of women's rights and equality. By mere existence, these organizations were defying the odds; the founding women were able to advance their organizations despite many factors working against them. The first "Women's Fraternities" not only had to overcome "restrictive social customs, unequal status under the law and the underlying presumption that they were less able than men," but at the same time had to deal with the same challenges as fraternities with college administrations. Today, both social and multicultural sororities are present on more than 650 college campuses across the United States and Canada. The National Panhellenic Conference (NPC) serves as the umbrella organization" for 26 international sororities. Founded in 1902, NPC is one of the oldest and largest women's membership organizations, representing more than four million women at 655 college and university campuses and 4,500 local alumni chapters in the U.S. and Canada.

Internationalization

In 1867, the Chi Phi fraternity established its Theta chapter at the University of Edinburgh in Scotland, marking the first foray of the American social fraternity outside the borders of the United States. At the time, many students from the American south were moving to Europe to study because of the disrepair southern universities fell into during the American Civil War. One such group of Americans organized Chi Phi at Edinburgh; however, during the Theta chapter's existence, it initiated no non-American members. With declining American enrollment at European universities, Chi Phi at Edinburgh closed in 1870.

Nine years following Chi Phi's abortive colonization of the University of Edinburgh, a second attempt was made to transplant the fraternity system outside the United States. In 1879, Zeta Psi established a chapter at the University of Toronto. Zeta Psi's success at Toronto prompted it to open a second Canadian chapter at McGill University, which it chartered in 1883. Other early foundations were Kappa Alpha Society at Toronto in 1892 and at McGill in 1899, and Alpha Delta Phi at Toronto in 1893 and at McGill in 1897. The first sorority, Kappa Alpha Theta, was established at Toronto in 1887. By 1927 there were 42 fraternity and sorority chapters at the University of Toronto and of 23 at McGill University. A few chapters were also reported at the University of British Columbia, Carleton University, Dalhousie University, University of Manitoba, Queen's University, University of Western Ontario, Wilfrid Laurier University, University of Waterloo and Brock University.

The arrival of the fraternity system in Asia accompanied the introduction of the American educational system in the Philippines. The first fraternities were established in the University of the Philippines. The now defunct Patriotic and Progressive Rizal Center Academic Brotherhood (Rizal Center Fraternity), a brotherhood of Jose Rizal followers, was founded in 1913. This was followed by the Rizal Center Sorority. The first Greek-letter organization and fraternity in Asia, the Upsilon Sigma Phi, was founded in 1918. The first Greek-letter sorority, UP Sigma Beta Sorority, was recognized in 1932.

Religion

Many early fraternities made reference to Christian principles or to a Supreme Being in general, as is characteristic of fraternal orders. Some, such as Alpha Chi Rho (1895) and Alpha Kappa Lambda (1907), only admitted Christians, while others, such as Beta Sigma Psi (1925) and Phi Kappa Theta (1959), catered to students belonging with certain denominations of Christianity, such as Lutheranism and Catholicism.

Due to their exclusion from Christian fraternities in the United States, Jewish students began to establish their own fraternities in the period of 1895 and 1920, with the first one being Zeta Beta Tau, founded in 1898.

Although many of the religion-specific requirements for many fraternities and sororities have been relaxed or removed, there are some today that continue to rally around their faith as a focal point, such as Beta Upsilon Chi (1985) and Sigma Alpha Omega (1998).

Multiculturalism 

Numerous Greek organizations in the past have enacted formal and informal prohibitions on pledging individuals of different races and cultural backgrounds. This began with historically White fraternities and sororities excluding African-Americans due to racism. Historically Black fraternities and sororities were spearheaded thereafter in response.

Racist policies have since been abolished by the North American Interfraternity Conference, and students of various ethnicities have come together to form a council of multicultural Greek organizations. The National Multicultural Greek Council, officially formed in 1998, is a coordinating body of 19 Greek organizations, including nine fraternities, and ten sororities with cultural affiliations.

The first multicultural sorority, Mu Sigma Upsilon, was established in November 1981 at Rutgers University in New Brunswick, New Jersey.  The formation of this Greek organization allowed for the emergence of a multicultural fraternity and sorority movement, giving birth to a multicultural movement.

Structure and organization

Common elements

Gender exclusivity
Fraternities and sororities traditionally have been single-sex organizations, with fraternities consisting exclusively of men and sororities consisting exclusively of women. In the United States, fraternities and sororities have a statutory exemption from Title IX legislation prohibiting this type of gender exclusion within student groups, and organizations such as the Fraternity and Sorority Political Action Committee lobby to maintain it.

Since the mid-20th century a small number of fraternities, such as Alpha Theta, Lambda Lambda Lambda, and Alpha Phi Omega have opted to become co-educational and admit female members; however, these generally represent a minority of Greek-letter organizations and no such fraternity is currently a member of the North American Interfraternity Conference, the largest international association of fraternities.  The first coed fraternity was Pi Alpha Tau (1963–1991) at the University of Illinois at Chicago.

Much more commonly, coed fraternities exist in the form of service fraternities, such as Alpha Phi Omega, Epsilon Sigma Alpha, Alpha Tau Mu and others. These organizations are similar to social fraternities and sororities, with the exception of being coed and non-residential.

In 2014, Sigma Phi Epsilon became the first fraternity in the North American Interfraternity Conference to accept transgender members, or those identifying as male, to join the social fraternity. Several sororities have adjusted their policies to confirm that transgender prospective members are allowable.

Importantly, all these variants have stemmed from a process of self-determination, without challenge by other Greeks. In a bellwether case in 2016, Harvard University changed its student conduct code to bar members of single-sex groups from leading campus groups, serving as captains of sports teams or participating in valuable academic fellowships. This is being contested vigorously in U.S. federal court by several affected fraternities and sororities.

Governance
Individual chapters of fraternities and sororities are largely self-governed by their active (student) members; however, alumni members may retain legal ownership of the fraternity or sorority's property through an alumni chapter or alumni corporation. All of a single fraternity or sorority's chapters are generally grouped together in a national or international organization that sets standards, regulates insignia and ritual, publishes a journal or magazine for all of the chapters of the organization, and has the power to grant and revoke charters to chapters. These federal structures are largely governed by alumni members of the fraternity, though with some input from the active (student) members.

Rushing and pledging (recruitment and new member periods)

Most Greek letter organizations select potential members through a two-part process of vetting and probation, called rushing and pledging, respectively. During rush (recruitment), students attend designated social events, and sometimes formal interviews, hosted by the chapters of fraternities and sororities in which they have particular interest. Usually, after a potential new member has attended several such events, officers or current members meet privately to vote on whether or not to extend an invitation (known as a "bid") to the prospective applicant. Those applicants who receive a bid, and choose to accept it, are considered to have "pledged" the fraternity or sorority, thus beginning the pledge period (new member period). Students participating in rush are known as "rushees" (Potential New Members "PNMs") while students who have accepted a bid to a specific fraternity or sorority are known as "new members" or in some cases "pledges".

A new member period may last anywhere from one weekend to several months. During this time, new members might participate in almost all aspects of the life of the fraternity or sorority, but most likely not be permitted to hold office in the organization. At the conclusion of the new member period, a second vote of members may sometimes be taken, often, but not always, using a blackball system. New members who pass this second vote are invited to a formal and secret ritual of initiation into the organization, advancing them to full membership.

Many Greek-letter organizations give preferential consideration for pledging to candidates whose parent or sibling was a member of the same fraternity or sorority. Such prospective candidates are known as "legacies".

Membership in more than one fraternity or sorority is almost always prohibited. Recently, some Greek-letter organizations have replaced the term "pledge" with that of "associate member" or "new member". Sigma Alpha Epsilon, in 2014, abolished pledging altogether. Potential members are now immediately initiated into the fraternity upon accepting a bid.

Residency

Unique among most campus organizations, members of social Greek letter organizations usually congregate and sometimes live together in large houses generally privately owned by the organization itself (or by the organization alumni association). Often fraternities and sorority houses (called lodges or chapter houses) are located on the same street or in close quarters within the same neighborhood, which may be colloquially known as "Greek row", "frat row", or "sorority row". Often times, chapter houses are uniquely designed, highly elaborate, and very expensive to operate and maintain. Usually, the more expensive the house the higher the annual organization dues.  The features and size of Greek houses play a major role in chapters remaining competitive in recruiting and retaining members on many campuses.   At some, often small colleges, fraternities and sororities occupy a specific section of university-owned housing provided to them. Some fraternities and sororities are un-housed, with members providing for their own accommodations. In many of these cases, the fraternity or sorority owns or rents a non-residential clubhouse on or off campus to use for meetings and other activities.

Secrecy and ritual

With a few exceptions, most fraternities and sororities are secret societies. While the identity of members or officers is rarely concealed, fraternities and sororities initiate members following the pledge period through sometimes elaborate private rituals, frequently drawn or adopted from Masonic ritual practice or that of the Greek mysteries.

At the conclusion of an initiation ritual, the organization's secret motto, secret purpose and secret identification signs, such as handshakes and passwords, are usually revealed to its new members. Some fraternities also teach initiates an identity search device used to confirm fellow fraternity members.

Julian Hawthorne, the son of Nathaniel Hawthorne, wrote in his posthumously published Memoirs of his initiation into Delta Kappa Epsilon:
I was initiated into a college secret society—a couple of hours of grotesque and good-humored rodomontade and horseplay, in which I cooperated as in a kind of pleasant nightmare, confident, even when branded with a red-hot iron or doused head-over heels in boiling oil, that it would come out all right. The neophyte is effectively blindfolded during the proceedings, and at last, still sightless, I was led down flights of steps into a silent crypt, and helped into a coffin, where I was to stay until the Resurrection...Thus it was that just as my father passed from this earth, I was lying in a coffin during my initiation into Delta Kappa Epsilon.

Meetings and rituals are sometimes conducted in what is known as a chapter room located inside the fraternity's house. Entry into chapter rooms is often prohibited to all but the initiated. In one extreme case, the response of firefighters to a blaze signaled by an automated alarm at the Sigma Phi chapter house at the University of Wisconsin in 2003 was hampered in part because fraternity members refused to disclose the location of the hidden chapter room, where the conflagration had erupted, to emergency responders.

According to Assistant Professor Caroline Rolland-Diamond of the Paris West University Nanterre La Défense, in one ritual popular in the 1960s, born out of frustration to the ubiquitous nascent counterculture, "The men were stripped to their underpants, tied up to a tree, and covered in a nasty mix of food and leaves, remaining there until their fiancées came to free them with a kiss."

Symbols and naming conventions
The fraternity or sorority badge is an enduring symbol of membership in a Greek letter organization. Most fraternities also have assumed heraldic achievements. Members of fraternities and sororities address members of the same organization as "brother" (in the case of fraternities) or "sister" (in the case of sororities). The names of almost all fraternities and sororities consist of a sequence of two or three Greek letters, for instance, Delta Delta Delta, Sigma Chi, Chi Omega, or Psi Upsilon.  There are a few exceptions to this general rule, as in the case of the fraternities Triangle, Acacia, and Seal and Serpent.

Membership profile

Demographics

There are approximately nine million student and alumni members of fraternities and sororities in North America, or about three percent of the total population. Roughly 750,000 of the current fraternity and sorority members are students who belong to an undergraduate chapter.

A 2007 survey conducted by Princeton University found that white and higher income Princeton students are much more likely than other Princeton students to be in fraternities and sororities. Senior surveys from the classes of 2009 and 2010 showed that 77 percent of sorority members and 73 percent of fraternity members were white.

Notable fraternity and sorority members
Since 1900, 63 percent of members of the United States cabinet have been members of fraternities and sororities, and the current chief executive officers of five of the ten largest Fortune 500 companies are members of fraternities and sororities. In addition, 85 percent of all justices of the U.S. Supreme Court since 1910 have been members of fraternities. U.S. presidents since World War II who have been initiated into fraternities are George W. Bush, George H. W. Bush, Bill Clinton, Ronald Reagan, Gerald Ford, and Franklin Roosevelt. Three Prime Ministers of Canada have been members of fraternities.

In 2013, about 25 percent of members of the U.S. House of Representatives and 40 percent of members of the U.S. Senate were members of fraternities or sororities.

Academic performance
Studies have found that university graduation rates are 20 percent higher among members of Greek-letter organizations than among non-members, and students who are members of fraternities and sororities typically have higher-than-average grade point averages. One reason for this is many chapters require their members to maintain a certain academic standard. 

Each organization requires its members to maintain a minimum GPA in order to continue their membership. Greek members who maintain high GPA's are invited to join notable Greek honor societies. The two most notable Greek honor societies include: Gamma Sigma Alpha and Order of Omega. Gamma Sigma Alpha acknowledges Greek members who hold a 3.5 GPA in upper division classes. Order of Omega recognizes the top 3% of Greek members who exemplify leadership qualities. Greek honor societies provide life-time membership with opportunities such as scholarships and networking.

Professional advancement
There is a high representation of former Greek life members among certain elites in the United States. Greek members "are more likely to be thriving in their well-being and engaged at work than college graduates who did not go Greek," according to a study done by Gallup and Purdue University.

Personal fulfillment
A 2014 Gallup survey of 30,000 university alumni found that persons who said they had been members of Greek-letter organizations while undergraduates reported having a greater sense of purpose, as well as better social and physical well-being, than those who had not.

Criticism

Homogeneous membership and elitism
Greek letter organizations have often been characterized as elitist or exclusionary associations, organized for the benefit of a largely white, upper-class membership base. Members of fraternities and sororities disproportionately come from certain socio-economic demographics. Fraternities specifically have been criticized for what is perceived as their promotion of an excessively alcohol-fueled, party-focused lifestyle.

New York Times columnist Frank Bruni questioned the existence of exclusive clubs on campuses that are meant to facilitate independence, writing "Colleges should be cultivating the kind of sensibility that makes you a better citizen of a diverse and distressingly fractious society. How is that served by retreating into an exclusionary clique of people just like you?"

Some colleges and universities have banned Greek letter organizations on the grounds that they are, by their very nature and structure, elitist and exclusionary. The oldest ban was at Princeton University, though Princeton has now had fraternities since the 1980s. Oberlin College banned "secret societies" (fraternities and sororities) in 1847, and the prohibition continues to the present. Quaker universities, such as Guilford College and Earlham College, often ban fraternities and sororities because they are seen as a violation of the Quaker principle of equality. Brandeis University has never permitted fraternities or sororities as it maintains a policy that all student organizations have membership open to all.

Alcoholism
One Harvard University study found that "4 out of 5 fraternity and sorority members are binge drinkers. In comparison, other research suggests 2 out of 5 college students overall are regular binge drinkers." There is also a higher rate of alcohol-related death among fraternities, which has resulted in several lawsuits.

Hazing

Fraternities, and to a lesser extent sororities, have been criticized for hazing, sometimes committed by active undergraduate members against their chapter's pledges. Hazing during the pledge period can sometimes culminate in an event commonly known as "Hell Week" in which a week-long series of physical and mental torments are inflicted on pledges. Common hazing practices include sleep deprivation, sensory deprivation, paddling and other types of spanking, use of stress positions, forced runs, busy work, forced drinking, and mind games. Rarer incidents involving branding, enemas, urination on pledges, and the forced consumption of spoiled food have been reported. Hazing, in many cases, has been reported and has led to the permanent disposal of particular chapters of fraternities and sororities across the country.

Supporters  of fraternities note that hazing is almost universally prohibited by national fraternity organizations, and the occurrence of hazing in undergraduate fraternity chapters goes against official policy. Supporters of fraternities also note that hazing is not unique to Greek-letter organizations and is often reported in other student organizations, such as athletic teams.

In 2007, an anti-hazing hotline was set up to report incidents of hazing on college campuses. Currently, 46 national fraternity and sorority organizations support the toll-free number, which generates automatic email messages regarding hazing and sends them to the national headquarters directly from the National Anti-Hazing Hotline. Every year, the last week of September is considered to be National Hazing Prevention Week (NHPW).

There were several hazing incidents that resulted in deaths in 2017 including the death of Tim Piazza in which three members of Beta Theta Pi were sentenced to prison after pleading guilty in charges related to the hazing. Other incidents included the death of Maxwell Gruver, Andrew Coffey and Matthew Ellis.

Nepotism and networking
Critics of Greek-letter organizations assert that they create a culture of nepotism in later life, while supporters have applauded them for creating networking opportunities for members after graduation. A 2013 report by Bloomberg found that fraternity connections are influential in obtaining lucrative employment positions at top Wall Street brokerages. According to the report, recent graduates have been known to exchange the secret handshakes of their fraternities with executives whom they know are also members to obtain access to competitive appointments.

Sexism and sexual violence
Studies show that fraternity men are three times more likely to commit rape than other men on college campuses. Fraternity pledges are at a higher likelihood to commit rape or sexual assault because of the pressure to meet the hyper-masculine standards that fraternities expect of their members. Overall, fraternity men are shown to have more rape-supportive attitudes than non-fraternity men.

Fraternities have often been accused of fostering rape-supportive attitudes by promoting male dominance and brotherhood, and fraternity affiliation has been found to be a significant predictor of sexually predatory behavior in retrospective research.  Sexual assault is such a common occurrence among fraternity organizations that one fraternity, Sigma Alpha Epsilon, is commonly referred to by the nickname, "Sexual Assault Expected". Attitudes towards women learned in fraternity life can perpetuate fraternity men's lifelong attitudes, leading to the potential to commit sexual assault and rape after college life. Furthermore, studies show that women in sororities are almost twice as likely to experience rape than other college women. A research article studied campus demographics and reported rapes and found that campuses that report more rapes have more fraternity men, athletes and liquor violations.

Researchers have found that in predominantly-male environments, such as fraternities, athletics and military groups, men feel pressure to meet the group's standard of masculinity, which may contribute to men being more accepting of sexual violence. Nicholas Syrett, a professor of history at the University of Northern Colorado, has been a vocal critic of the evolution of fraternities in the 20th century. In 2011, Syrett stated that, "fraternal masculinity has, for at least 80 years, valorized athletics, alcohol abuse and sex with women." Time magazine columnist Jessica Bennett has denounced fraternities as breeding "sexism and misogyny that lasts long after college". In her column, Bennett recounts that, while she was an undergraduate student at the University of Southern California, doormen at fraternity parties "often ranked women on a scale of 1 to 10, with only 'sixes' and up granted entry to a party".

To protect their fraternity's brotherhood, fraternity men and athletes may not confront or report sexual assault when it happens. Perpetrators have often received little to no consequences for their actions.

Test and homework banks 
It is common for members of Greek-letter organizations to have higher-than-average GPAs due to test and homework banks filled over the years by members of their organization. There is much backlash condemning the test and homework banks as academic dishonesty.

Racism and minority discrimination 

Researchers, such as Matthew W. Hughey, have linked racism in Greek life to persons experiencing microaggressions, fewer opportunities to use the networking system built into Greek life and the use of harmful stereotypes. In response to experiencing racism and exclusion from solely or predominantly white GLOs, black and multicultural GLOs were founded.

Additionally, homophobia, transphobia, antisemitism, and xenophobia are issues with many college Greek systems across the nation.

Glossary

 Active – an initiated, undergraduate student member of a fraternity or sorority.
 Alumna/alumnus – a member of a sorority or fraternity who is no longer an undergraduate student and no longer resides in the house.
An auxiliary group (also "sweetheart" or "little brother/sister" group) is an unofficial, unsanctioned partner organization to a fraternity or sorority, usually for members of the opposite sex. The two largest Greek umbrella organizations for social fraternities and sororities, the North American Interfraternity Conference and the National Panhellenic Conference, ban the formation of or discourage membership in auxiliary groups. Some fraternities and sororities outside of these conferences also ban auxiliaries, including Phi Mu Alpha Sinfonia and Sigma Alpha Iota. Part of the rationale behind banning auxiliary groups is that such groups could jeopardize the host organizations' Title IX exemptions, citing the United States Supreme Court's ruling in Roberts v. United States Jaycees.
 Bid – an offer to become a pledge (see below) of a fraternity or sorority.
 Blacklist – an official or unofficial list of people not allowed inside the house or to any events of the fraternity or sorority. 
 Blackballed – in this context used as a definition of expelling from a community or group. This means that a person may not be accepted by any fraternity or sorority because of the negative reputation they gained at a particular group. This is usually an informal discussion made by the presidents or rush chairs of the fraternities or sororities. 
 Chapter room – a room inside a fraternity house, often secret or hidden, where meetings of actives occur and where rituals are performed.
 Colony – a newly established chapter of a national/international fraternity or sorority in the process of organization.
Frat Boy – a member of a fraternity characterized by a way of dressing and a homogeneous behavior as other members of that fraternity.
 Legacy – a rushee who is related to a member of the same fraternity or sorority they are rushing is almost always offered a bid. Traditionally a legacy has a parent or sibling that is a member, but some organizations have expanded on their definition of a legacy's relation to members.
 Local – a fraternity or sorority with only one chapter.
 National/international – a fraternity or sorority with two or more chapters, both of which are in the same nation (in the case of a national), or at least one of which is in a different nation from the others (in the case of an international).
 Pledge – a probationary member of a fraternity or sorority, sometimes also called "associate member."
Pledge pin – a pin worn by pledges for the duration of the pledging period, usually during all times not considered dangerous to do so (during sports, etc.). It is usually given to a pledge following a ceremony when they are first offered membership in the organization and can be worn until their initiation. In some Greek systems, pledge pins may be the target of informal 'theft' from other groups as a means of promoting interaction between each other on campus. In some fraternities, especially those who no longer have a pledge process, it may be called a new member pin. Women's sororities usually only require new members to wear pins when active members must wear theirs, usually for formal meetings and ritual ceremonies.
 Potential new member – Abbreviated PNM, one who is in the process of seeking a bid.
 Rush – the process of recruitment to a fraternity or sorority.
 Rushee – one who is in the process of seeking a bid.

See also
 Academic dress'
 Collegiate secret societies in North America
 Defunct North American collegiate sororities
 Faluche
 High school secret societies
 Honor society
 List of social fraternities and sororities
 Professional fraternities and sororities 
 Secret society 
 Service fraternities and sororities
 Students' union

References

Further reading
 Caitlin Flanagan, "The Dark Power of Fraternities," The Atlantic, March, 2014, pp. 72–91.